Lophophleps phoenicoptera is a species of moth of the family Geometridae first described by George Hampson in 1896. It is found in Sri Lanka, India, Peninsular Malaysia, Java and Borneo.

Subspecies
Lophophleps phoenicoptera phoenicoptera
Lophophleps phoenicoptera tuita (Peninsular Malaysia, Java, Borneo)

References

Sterrhini
Moths described in 1896